Lumpinee Boxing Stadium is a sporting arena in Bangkok, Thailand.  The stadium is named after Lumbini, the birthplace of the Buddha. Opened more than a decade later than Rajadamnern Stadium, Lumpinee is run by the Royal Thai Army. It has become the symbol of modern Muay Thai. Only Rajadamnern Stadium rivals the prestige of holding the title of "Muay Thai Champion of Lumpinee". The ranking system and championship titles are held from mini flyweight (105 lb) up to super welterweight (154 lb).
 
Muay Thai bouts are held on Tuesdays, Fridays, and Saturdays. The fights usually start around 18:00.

The final event at its original site on Rama IV Road near Lumphini Park was held on 8 February 2014. The stadium then moved to its new home on Ram Intra Road which can hold up to 5,000 spectators. The new stadium held the first fight on 11 February 2014 and was officially opened on 28 February 2014.

History

General Praphas Charusathien was the driving force behind the construction of the Lumpinee Stadium, the second national stadium built in Thailand after Rajadamnern. Lumpinee opened its doors on 8 December 1956. The stadium is operated by the Army Welfare Department of the Royal Thai Army. All proceeds from the fights go towards supporting the various departments of the Thai Army. The board of directors,  headed by Army Commander Apirat Kongsompong, consists entirely of army officers.

Eleven promoters are responsible for booking boxers to fight at the stadium. Women are not allowed to fight in the stadium or enter the ring.

One of the most famous Lumpinee champions was Dieselnoi Chor Thanasukarn who reigned without defeat in the early-1980s, holding the Lightweight title for four years. He was eventually forced to retire because he ran out of opponents.

Lumpinee Stadium was implicated in a cluster of COVID-19 cases during the coronavirus pandemic in Thailand in 2020. Boxing matches were held on 6 March 2020 in spite of a government shutdown order issued on 3 March. Among those later stricken by COVID-19 was the chief of the Army Welfare Department, who had been at the stadium.

In early 2021, it was reported that the Army was considering releasing the stadium to the private sector, or turning the stadium into a museum. In response to this, Lumpinee management announced their intention to re-brand and implement major changes. These changes included allowing women to fight in the stadium, begin hosting mixed martial arts bouts and ban gambling in order to attract a non-gambling audience.

Traditionally reserved for male fighters, Lumpinee Stadium eventually hosted its first female fight card on November 13, 2021. The main event featured Buakaw Mor.Kor.Chor.Chaiyaphum facing Sanaejan Sor.Jor.Tongprajin for the WBC Muaythai mini flyweight championship and Lumpinee Stadium women's mini flyweight championship, with Sanaejan winning by decision. 
 
Having long been a venue for Muay Thai, Lumpinee Stadium made history by holding its first mixed martial arts event on January 16, 2022, hosted by Fairtex Fight Promotion. The event consisted of both Muay Thai and MMA fights. In August 2022 it began hoisting ONE Championship events, with nearly all fights under Muay Thai rules.

Notable champions 

 Samart Payakaroon
 Sak Kaoponlek
 Sitthichai Sitsongpeenong
 Yodsanklai Fairtex
 Dieselnoi Chor Thanasukarn
 Anuwat Kaewsamrit
 Saenchai Sor Kingstar
 Buakaw Banchamek
 Coban Lookchaomaesaitong
 Saiyok Pumpanmuang
 Jomhod Kiatadisak
 Orono Wor Petchpun
 Matee Jedeepitak
 Petch-eak Sidjaopho
 Petch-tho Sidjaopho

Only six non-Thai athletes have become Lumpinee champions.
The first winner was French-Algerian fighter Morad Sari, who claimed the super lightweight championship in 1999. French fighter Damien Alamos won the super lightweight title in 2012 and was the first foreigner to defend the belt later that year. France's Rafi Bohic, won the welterweight title in 2017 and defended the belt four times.  Moroccan-Belgian Youssef Boughanem won the middleweight title in 2018. Japan's Nadaka Yoshinari became mini flyweight champion in 2019, though he won the belt at an event in Japan. The last non-Thai fighter to win the belt was Jimmy Vienot in 2019 at middleweight.  
A number of non-Thais have achieved top 10 rankings within the stadium. Ramon Dekkers is one of the most renowned foreign fighters in Lumpinee history, but he never won the Lumpinee belt. Stéphane Nikiéma would have been the second foreign Lumpinee champion, but his title fight ended in a no-contest.

Current champions

See also
Rajadamnern Stadium
World Muaythai Council

References

External links

 Muay Thai rules of Lumpinee Stadium
 Lumpinee set to hang up its gloves

Indoor arenas in Thailand
Kickboxing in Thailand
Professional Muay Thai organizations
Muay Thai venues in Thailand
Muay Thai venues in Bangkok
Sports venues in Bangkok
Boxing venues in Thailand
Pathum Wan district
Sports venues completed in 1956
1956 establishments in Thailand